Sefer haYashar (Hebrew  ספר הישר) means "Book of the Upright One", but Jashar is generally left untranslated into English and so Sefer haYashar is often rendered as Book of Jasher.

Rabbinical treatises
 Sefer haYashar, a collection of sayings of the sages from the Amoraim period in Rabbi Zerahiah's Sefer Hayasher
 Sefer haYashar, a commentary on the Pentateuch by the 12th-century Abraham ibn Ezra
 Sefer haYashar, by the Kabbalist and philosopher Abraham Abulafia
 Sefer haYashar (Rabbeinu Tam), 12th-century treatise on Jewish ritual and ethics
 Sefer haYashar of Zerahiah the Greek, a moral treatise of the 13th century 
 Sefer haYashar (midrash), a 16th-century book of Jewish legends

Other uses
 Book of Jasher (biblical references)
 Book of Jasher (Pseudo-Jasher), an 18th-century forgery by a London printer, Jacob Ilive
 Book of Jashar, fictional translation of the supposed Book of Jasher mentioned in 2 Samuel by Benjamin Rosenbaum (born 1969)